The 1988 United States presidential election in Wisconsin took place on November 8, 1988. All 50 states and the District of Columbia, were part of the 1988 United States presidential election. State voters chose 11 electors to the Electoral College, which selected the president and vice president.

Wisconsin was won by Massachusetts Governor Michael Dukakis who was running against incumbent United States Vice President George H. W. Bush of Texas. Dukakis ran with Texas Senator Lloyd Bentsen as Vice President, and Bush ran with Indiana Senator Dan Quayle.

Dukakis won the election in Wisconsin with a four point margin. The state has since consistently voted for the Democratic Party, until the narrow victory of Republican Donald Trump in 2016. The narrow election results in the rapidly liberalizing state of Wisconsin were reflective of a nationwide reconsolidation of base for the Republican Party, which took place through the 1980s. Through the passage of some very controversial economic programs, spearheaded by then-President Ronald Reagan (called, collectively, "Reaganomics"), the mid-to-late 1980s saw a period of economic growth and stability. The hallmark for Reaganomics was, in part, the wide-scale deregulation of corporate interests, and tax cuts for the wealthy.

Dukakis ran his campaign on a socially liberal platform and advocated for higher economic regulation and environmental protection. Bush, alternatively, ran on a campaign of continuing the social and economic policies of Reagan – which gained him much support with social conservatives and people living in rural areas, who largely associated the Republican Party with the economic growth of the 1980s. Additionally, while the economic programs passed under Reagan and furthered under Bush and Bill Clinton may have boosted the economy for a brief period, they are criticized by many analysts as "setting the stage" for economic troubles in the United States after 2007, such as the Great Recession.

The election was very partisan, with over 99 percent of the electorate voting for either the Republican or Democratic parties, although five additional candidates were on the ballot. Dukakis and Bush almost evenly split Wisconsin's seventy-two counties – Dukakis won 37 and Bush won 35. Dukakis won the large urban counties containing Madison (Dane County), Milwaukee, Racine and Kenosha, alongside almost entirely Native American Menominee County and the heavily unionized Scandinavian-American counties of the northwest. Bush won the suburban "WOW counties" and the more conservative, historically German Catholic, counties of the rural eastern half of the state. Over the state as a whole, Dukakis did best, as usual, in Menominee County, and Bush did best in Ozaukee County.

Wisconsin weighed in for this election as 12 points more Democratic than the national average. , this is the last election in which Green County voted for a Republican presidential candidate, the last time that the state would vote to the left of neighboring Michigan or Illinois. This would be the most recent election when the Democratic candidate won Wisconsin while losing Illinois at the same time, and the last time they voted differently until 2016.

It was also the first time since 1960 that Wisconsin would back the losing candidate in a presidential election. It was also the first time since 1848 that the state would back a losing Democrat in a presidential election, and the first time ever that the state would back a Democrat while a Republican won the presidency. This was the first time since 1924 that a Republican won without the state.

Results

Results by county

Notes

See also
 Presidency of George H. W. Bush
 United States presidential elections in Wisconsin

References

Wisconsin
1988
1988 Wisconsin elections